Kim Yun-hee (born 23 March 1994) is a South Korean archer competing in women's compound events. She won, alongside So Chae-won, the gold medal in the women's team compound event at the 2019 Summer Universiade held in Naples, Italy. She also won the gold medal in this event at the 2017 Summer Universiade held in Taipei, Taiwan.

At the 2015 World Archery Championships held in Copenhagen, Denmark, she won the gold medal in the women's individual and mixed team events. She also won the bronze medal in the women's team event.

References

External links 
 

Living people
1994 births
Place of birth missing (living people)
South Korean female archers
World Archery Championships medalists
Universiade medalists in archery
Universiade gold medalists for South Korea
Universiade bronze medalists for South Korea
Medalists at the 2015 Summer Universiade
Medalists at the 2017 Summer Universiade
Medalists at the 2019 Summer Universiade
Asian Games medalists in archery
Asian Games gold medalists for South Korea
Archers at the 2014 Asian Games
Archers at the 2018 Asian Games
Medalists at the 2014 Asian Games
21st-century South Korean women